Swainsonia is a genus of sea snails, marine gastropod mollusks in the subfamily Imbricariinae of the family Mitridae.

Species
Species within the genus Swainsonia include:
 Swainsonia biconica (Bozzetti, 2011)
 Swainsonia casta (Gmelin, 1791)
 Swainsonia ekerae (Cernohorsky, 1973)
 Swainsonia fissurata Lamarck
 Swainsonia fusca (Swainson, 1824)
 Swainsonia limata (Reeve, 1845)
 Swainsonia newcombii (Pease, 1869)
 Swainsonia ocellata (Swainson, 1831)

Species brought into synonymy
 Swainsonia albina (A. Adams, 1853): synonym of Scabricola albina (A. Adams, 1853)
 Swainsonia bicolor (Swainson, 1824): synonym of Scabricola bicolor (Swainson, 1824)
 Swainsonia cloveri (Cernohorsky, 1971): synonym of Imbricaria cloveri (Cernohorsky, 1971)
 Swainsonia incisa (A. Adams & Reeve, 1850): synonym of Scabricola incisa (A. Adams & Reeve, 185o)
 Swainsonia mariae (A. Adams, 1853): synonym of Scabricola mariae (A. Adams, 1853)
 Swainsonia millepunctata (Schepman, 1911) : synonym of Cancilla schepmani (Salisbury & Guillot de Suduiraut, 2003)
 Swainsonia olivaeformis (Swainson, 1821): synonym of Scabricola olivaeformis (Swainson, 1821)
 Swainsonia schepmani (Salisbury & Guillot de Suduiraut, 2003): synonym of Cancilla schepmani (Salisbury & Guillot de Suduiraut, 2003)

References

 Cernohorsky W. O. (1991). The Mitridae of the world (Part 2). Monographs of Marine Mollusca 4.

External links
  Adams, H. & Adams, A. (1853-1858). The genera of Recent Mollusca; arranged according to their organization. London, van Voorst. Vol. 1: xl + 484 pp.; vol. 2: 661 pp.; vol. 3: 138 pls.
  Swainson W. (1829-1833). Zoological Illustrations, or original figures and descriptions of new, rare, or interesting animals, selected chiefly from the classes of ornithology, entomology, and conchology, and arranged according to their apparent affinities. Second series. London: Baldwin & Cradock. (Vol. 1-3): pl. 1-30 
 Fedosov A., Puillandre N., Herrmann M., Kantor Yu., Oliverio M., Dgebuadze P., Modica M.V. & Bouchet P. (2018). The collapse of Mitra: molecular systematics and morphology of the Mitridae (Gastropoda: Neogastropoda). Zoological Journal of the Linnean Society. 183(2): 253-337

 
Mitridae
Gastropod genera